Kevin Mark Sheedy (born 21 October 1959) is a football coach and former Republic of Ireland international player.

He spent the largest portion of his playing career with Everton – with whom he won the FA Cup, European Cup Winners' Cup and two Football League titles – and also played for Hereford United, Liverpool, Newcastle United and Blackpool. Born in Builth Wells, Wales, he played 46 times for the Republic of Ireland national team and scored the country's first ever goal in a FIFA World Cup finals.

Playing career

Club career
After playing for Hereford Lads Club as a boy, Sheedy started his career with Hereford United, followed by a short spell with Liverpool, but played just three competitive games in four years and was sold to Everton for £100,000 in 1982. At Everton he made 357 appearances (12 as substitute) and scored 97 goals.

Sheedy's most notable achievements were as part of Everton's title winning teams in 1985 and 1987, and in 1985 the European Cup Winners' Cup, scoring in the final itself. In the 1980s Sheedy scored the most goals from free-kicks in the top-flight of the English football league. Perhaps his most famous free-kick moment came in an FA Cup tie against Ipswich Town in 1985 when he scored with a 19-yard free-kick into goalkeeper Paul Cooper's right-hand corner, but having been forced to re-take the kick, proceeded to curl the ball into the keeper's left-hand corner. He was selected in the PFA Team of the Year in both Everton championship winning years of 1985 and 1987.

Sheedy left Goodison Park in 1992 after 10 years on a free transfer to join Newcastle United, and helped them win the Division One title, and promotion to the Premier League, in 1992–93. He ended his career with Blackpool in the 1993–94 Division Two campaign.

International career
Although born in Wales, Sheedy held Irish citizenship from birth and chose to play for the Republic of Ireland national team. His Irish citizenship stemmed from the fact that his father was from County Clare. He played 46 times for Ireland scoring nine goals, including one in a game in the 1990 World Cup against England. Ireland drew all three of their group games to qualify for the last 16 of the tournament, and subsequently beat Romania 5–4 on penalties, Sheedy scoring the first of Ireland's penalties. Ireland went on to lose 1–0 to hosts Italy in the quarter-final of the FIFA World Cup.

Sheedy was also part of the Euro 88 squad and played all three matches. He is also noted as the first-ever Republic of Ireland player to score a goal in the World Cup finals.

Managerial career
Since retiring from playing, Sheedy has been assistant manager at Tranmere Rovers (and a short spell as joint-caretaker manager) and Hartlepool United. He joined Everton's coaching staff in July 2006, where he coached the academy team.

Al-Shabab
Sheedy spent three years working with the junior players in Saudi Arabia at Al-Shabab from 2017 from 2020.

Waterford
On 17 December 2020, Sheedy was appointed manager of League of Ireland Premier Division side Waterford, with Mike Newell as assistant. He was sacked from the post on 5 May 2021 with the club bottom of the table after nine games.

Personal life
In late August 2012 Sheedy was diagnosed with bowel cancer. He revealed to the media that his family had a history of the disease

Honours
Liverpool
Football League Cup: 1982
Everton
Football League First Division: 1984–85, 1986–87
European Cup Winners' Cup: 1985
FA Charity Shield: 1984, 1985, 1986 (shared), 1987
Newcastle United
Football League Championship: 1992–93

Awards
 PFA First Division Team of the Year: 1984–85, 1986–87

See also
 List of Republic of Ireland international footballers born outside the Republic of Ireland

References

External links
 LFChistory.net player profile
 Profile at ToffeeWeb
 Post War English & Scottish Football League A–Z Player's Transfer Database profile's statistics site
 BBC Profile

1959 births
Living people
Republic of Ireland association footballers
Republic of Ireland international footballers
Republic of Ireland under-21 international footballers
Hereford Lads Club F.C. players
Hereford United F.C. players
Liverpool F.C. players
Everton F.C. players
Newcastle United F.C. players
Blackpool F.C. players
Republic of Ireland football managers
Tranmere Rovers F.C. managers
Everton F.C. non-playing staff
UEFA Euro 1988 players
1990 FIFA World Cup players
Welsh people of Irish descent
People from Builth Wells
Sportspeople from Powys
Association football midfielders
Hartlepool United F.C. non-playing staff
FA Cup Final players